Lawrence Creek is a town in Creek County, Oklahoma, United States. Incorporated March 15, 1983, it is primarily a bedroom community whose employed residents work in Sapulpa and Tulsa. The population was 149 at the 2010 census, a gain of 25.2 percent over the figure of 119 recorded in 2000.

Geography
Lawrence Creek is located in northern Creek County at  (36.084402, -96.420441).

Demographics

As of the census of 2000, there were 119 people, 40 households, and 33 families residing in the town. There were 41 housing units at an average density of 63.6 per square mile (24.7/km2). The racial makeup of the town was 89.92% White and 10.08% Native American. Hispanic or Latino of any race were 0.84% of the population.

There were 40 households, out of which 37.5% had children under the age of 18 living with them, 70.0% were married couples living together, 10.0% had a female householder with no husband present, and 17.5% were non-families. 15.0% of all households were made up of individuals, and 7.5% had someone living alone who was 65 years of age or older. The average household size was 2.98 and the average family size was 3.36.

In the town, the population was spread out, with 33.6% under the age of 18, 6.7% from 18 to 24, 31.1% from 25 to 44, 23.5% from 45 to 64, and 5.0% who were 65 years of age or older. The median age was 33 years. For every 100 females, there were 91.9 males. For every 100 females age 18 and over, there were 107.9 males.

The median income for a household in the town was $24,583, and the median income for a family was $28,750. Males had a median income of $24,286 versus $15,781 for females. The per capita income for the town was $9,957. There were no families and 2.9% of the population living below the poverty line, including no under eighteens and 28.6% of those over 64.

Roads
The town is about seven miles southwest of Mannford.

References

Towns in Creek County, Oklahoma
Towns in Oklahoma